Ergoiena is a municipality located in the province and autonomous community of Navarre, northern Spain. The Basque municipality numbers three villages, Lizarraga, Unanu and Dorrao. It bounds with the range Urbasa on the west and south, and with Andia on the east.

References

External links
 ERGOIENA in the Bernardo Estornés Lasa - Auñamendi Encyclopedia (Euskomedia Fundazioa) 
 Ergoiena Valley at Google.maps

Municipalities in Navarre